Kurt Branting (1 February 1900 – 1 July 1958) was a Swedish sprinter. He competed in the men's 4 × 100 metres relay at the 1924 Summer Olympics.

References

External links
 

1900 births
1958 deaths
Athletes (track and field) at the 1924 Summer Olympics
Swedish male sprinters
Olympic athletes of Sweden
Place of birth missing
20th-century Swedish people